Queen Charlotte was built in France and first appeared in Lloyd's Register (LR) in 1786, the 1785 issue, if any, not being available on line. She was employed as whaler, in the British northern whale fishery, sailing to Greenland and Davis Strait. From late 1793 she made at least one voyage as a West Indiaman. Although she was last listed in 1796, there is no evidence that she sailed again after late 1794.

Career
Queen Charlotte first appeared in online records in 1786 as a northern fisheries whaler. On 24 July 1786 a newspaper reported that Queen Charlotte, Wheatley, master, had arrived in the Thames from Greenland with four "fish" (whales).<ref>"News". Public Advertiser (London, England), Monday, July 24, 1786; Issue 16278.</ref>

On 9 March 1793, immediately after the outbreak of war with France Captain John Wheatley acquired a letter of marque. However, Queen Charlotte continued to operate as a whaler. On 4 September 1793 Queen Charlotte arrived at Gravesend from Davis Strait.Queen Charlotte became a West Indiaman, returning to Gravesend on 2 October 1794 from Martinique.

FateQueen Charlotte was last listed in LR in 1796. However, she does not appear in Lloyd's List'' or the press after 1794.

Citations

1780s ships
Age of Sail merchant ships of England
Whaling ships